AdventHealth Orlando (formerly Florida Hospital Orlando) is the largest hospital owned by AdventHealth with over 1,432-beds, faith-based, non-profit, tertiary, research and academic medical center located in Orlando, Florida, servicing Central Florida and the Orange county region. It is the second largest hospital in Florida and the largest in Central Florida. AdventHealth Orlando is the 10th largest hospital in the United States in 2019. AdventHealth Orlando is the oldest Seventh-day Adventist Hospital in the state of Florida.

History
In the 1900s Lydia and Rufus Parmele went to Orlando in hopes of opening a sanitarium like the one Lydia was trained in (Battle Creek Sanitarium). The couple and the Florida Conference of Seventh-day Adventists the Seventh-day Adventist Church searched for a potential location for the sanitarium with only $4.83. However, after some fundraising they purchased a two-story house for $9,000. On October 1, 1908, they opened the doors of the Florida Sanitarium or the Florida Tuberculosis Sanitarium. The hospital was run as a sanatorium that focused on treatments that included sunshine, rest, and the water cure (which connects itself to the principle of Water in the Seventh-day Adventist health mission titled Creation Life).

On January 2, 2019, Florida Hospital Orlando changed its name to AdventHealth Orlando.
In October 2020, 1,800 solar panel carport was installed at AdventHealth Orlando on top of its McRae parking garage. It can charge over thirty-two electric cars. It will create 1.3 million kilowatts yearly and will save over $4.6 million in energy costs.

Affiliations
AdventHealth Orlando has close ties with seven other hospitals in the Greater Orlando area. They are:
 AdventHealth Altamonte Springs
 AdventHealth Apopka
 AdventHealth Celebration
 AdventHealth East Orlando
 AdventHealth Kissimmee
 AdventHealth Winter Garden
 AdventHealth Winter Park

Awards
US News Rankings listed the AdventHealth Orlando Hospital 
 Nationally ranked in three adult specialties and one children's specialty.
 Regionally ranked #3 in Florida, #1 in Orlando (11 years in a row), #7 in Florida (Children's), and #16 in Southeast (Children's) 
 High Performing ranked in 6 Adult Specialties and 16 Procedures/Conditions

See also 

 List of AdventHealth hospitals
 List of Seventh-day Adventist hospitals

References

External links 
 

AdventHealth
Buildings and structures in Orlando, Florida
Christianity in Orlando, Florida
Healthcare in Orlando, Florida
Hospitals established in 1908
Hospitals in Florida